The 1988 Internationaux de Strasbourg was a women's tennis tournament played on outdoor clay courts in Strasbourg, France, and was part of the Category 2 tier of the 1988 WTA Tour. It was the second edition of the tournament and ran from 16 May until 22 May 1988. Second-seeded Sandra Cecchini won the singles title.

Finals

Singles

 Sandra Cecchini defeated  Judith Wiesner 6–3, 6–0
 It was Cecchini's 1st title of the year and the 8th of her career.

Doubles

 Manon Bollegraf /  Nicole Provis defeated  Jenny Byrne /  Janine Tremelling 7–5, 6–7(11–13), 6–3
 It was Bollegraf's only title of the year and the 1st of her career. It was Provis' only title of the year and the 1st of her career.

References

External links
 Official website 
 ITF tournament edition details 
 Tournament draws

Internationaux de Strasbourg
1988
Internationaux de Strasbourg
May 1988 sports events in Europe